Allan Armstrong Wilson (born 10 January 1945) is a Scottish former professional footballer who played in the Football League for Mansfield Town.

References

1945 births
Living people
Scottish footballers
Association football goalkeepers
English Football League players
Partick Thistle F.C. players
Scunthorpe United F.C. players
Mansfield Town F.C. players
Livingston F.C. players